This list is a form of detail the day-by-day summaries:

Day 1 (27 May)
Schedule of Play
 Seeds out:
 Men's Singles:  Andy Roddick [26],   Jürgen Melzer [30]

Day 2 (28 May)
Schedule of Play
 Seeds out:
 Men's Singles:  Feliciano López [15],  Radek Štěpánek [23]
 Women's Singles:  Vera Zvonareva [11] (withdrew),  Sabine Lisicki [12],  Roberta Vinci [17],  Mona Barthel [30],   Monica Niculescu [32]

Day 3 (29 May)
Schedule of Play
 Seeds out:
 Men's Singles:  Alexandr Dolgopolov [16]
 Women's Singles:  Serena Williams [5]
 Women's Doubles:  Iveta Benešová /  Barbora Záhlavová-Strýcová [8],  Bethanie Mattek-Sands /  Sania Mirza [15]

Day 4 (30 May)
Schedule of Play
 Seeds out:
 Women's Singles:  Marion Bartoli [8],  Lucie Šafářová [20],  Petra Cetkovská [24],  Zheng Jie [31]
 Women's Doubles:  Liezel Huber /  Lisa Raymond [1]
 Mixed Doubles:  Lisa Raymond /  Rohan Bopanna [4],  Andrea Hlaváčková /  Aisam-ul-Haq Qureshi [8]

Day 5 (31 May)
Schedule of Play
 Seeds out:
 Men's Singles:  John Isner [10],  Philipp Kohlschreiber [24],  Bernard Tomic [25],  Victor Troicki [28],  Florian Mayer [32]
 Women's Singles:  Maria Kirilenko [16],  Jelena Janković [19]
 Men's Doubles:  Mahesh Bhupathi /  Rohan Bopanna [6]
 Women's Doubles:  Raquel Kops-Jones /  Abigail Spears [10]

Day 6 (1 June)
Schedule of Play
 Seeds out:
 Men's Singles:  Gilles Simon [11],  Fernando Verdasco [14],  Marin Čilić [21],  Kevin Anderson [31]
 Women's Singles:  Agnieszka Radwańska [3],  Ana Ivanovic [13],  Flavia Pennetta [18],  Nadia Petrova [27],  Anabel Medina Garrigues [29]
 Men's Doubles:  Robert Lindstedt /  Horia Tecău [5],  František Čermák /  Filip Polášek [9],  Santiago González /  Christopher Kas [11],  Jonathan Erlich /  Andy Ram [13]
 Women's Doubles:  Natalie Grandin /  Vladimíra Uhlířová [9],  Marina Erakovic /  Monica Niculescu [16],  Gisela Dulko /  Paola Suárez [17]

Day 7 (2 June)
Schedule of Play
 Seeds out:
 Men's Singles:  Milos Raonic [19],  Mikhail Youzhny [27],  Julien Benneteau [29]
 Women's Singles:  Caroline Wozniacki [9],  Francesca Schiavone [14],  Anastasia Pavlyuchenkova [22],  Julia Görges [25],  Peng Shuai [28]
 Men's Doubles:  Mariusz Fyrstenberg /  Marcin Matkowski [4],  Leander Paes /  Alexander Peya [7],  Jürgen Melzer /  Philipp Petzschner [8]
 Women's Doubles:  Anabel Medina Garrigues /  Arantxa Parra Santonja [11]
 Mixed Doubles:   Katarina Srebotnik /  Nenad Zimonjić [3],  Nadia Petrova /  Daniel Nestor [6]

Day 8 (3 June)
Schedule of Play
 Seeds out:
Men's Singles:  Andreas Seppi [22]
Women's Singles:  Victoria Azarenka [1],  Svetlana Kuznetsova [26]
Men's Doubles:  Eric Butorac /  Bruno Soares [12],  Scott Lipsky /   Rajeev Ram [15],  Juan Sebastián Cabal /  Robert Farah Maksoud [16]

Day 9 (4 June)
Schedule of Play

Peschke/Bryan couple was eliminated in the quarterfinals of Mixed Doubles draw.
 Seeds out:
Men's Singles:  Tomáš Berdych [7],  Janko Tipsarević [8],  Juan Mónaco [13],  Richard Gasquet [17],  Stanislas Wawrinka [18],  Marcel Granollers [20]
Women's Singles:  Li Na [7]
Women's Doubles:  Ekaterina Makarova /  Elena Vesnina [6],  Jarmila Gajdošová /  Anastasia Rodionova [14]
 Mixed Doubles:   Květa Peschke /  Mike Bryan [2]

Day 10 (5 June)
Schedule of Play
 Seeds out:
Men's Singles:  Jo-Wilfried Tsonga [5],  Juan Martín del Potro [9]
Women's Singles:  Angelique Kerber [10],  Dominika Cibulková [15]
 Men's Doubles:  Michaël Llodra /  Nenad Zimonjić [3]
 Women's Doubles:  Květa Peschke /  Katarina Srebotnik [2],  Vania King /  Yaroslava Shvedova [3]
 Mixed Doubles:  Liezel Huber /  Max Mirnyi [1]

Day 11 (6 June)
Schedule of Play
 Seeds out:
 Men's Singles:  Andy Murray [4],  Nicolás Almagro [12]
 Women's Singles:  Kaia Kanepi [23]
 Women's Doubles:  Nuria Llagostera Vives /  María José Martínez Sánchez [12]
 Mixed Doubles:  Elena Vesnina /   Leander Paes [5]

Day 12 (7 June)
Schedule of Play
 Seeds out:
Women's Singles:  Petra Kvitová [4],  Samantha Stosur [6]
Men's Doubles:  Aisam-ul-Haq Qureshi /  Jean-Julien Rojer [10],  Daniele Bracciali /  Potito Starace [14]
Women's Doubles:  Andrea Hlaváčková /  Lucie Hradecká [5]

Day 13 (8 June)
Schedule of Play
 Seeds out:
Men's Singles:  Roger Federer [3],  David Ferrer [6]
Women's Doubles:  Maria Kirilenko /  Nadia Petrova [7]

Day 14 (9 June)
Schedule of Play
 Seeds out:
Women's Singles:  Sara Errani [21]
Men's Doubles:  Bob Bryan /  Mike Bryan [2]

Day 15 (10 June)
Schedule of Play

Day 16 (11 June)
Schedule of Play
 Seeds out:
Men's Singles:  Novak Djokovic [1]

Day-by-day summaries
French Open by year – Day-by-day summaries